Henry John McMahon (December 19, 1886 – December 11, 1929) was a right-handed starting pitcher in Major League Baseball who played briefly for the 1908 Boston Red Sox. McMahon was born in Woburn, Massachusetts, and attended the College of the Holy Cross, Graduated from Tuft's University of Dentistry.

McMahon's only major league appearance was on October 6, 1908, in Boston's next-to-last game of the season. He started against the New York Highlanders at the Huntington Avenue Grounds and collected an 11–3, complete game victory, allowing three earned runs (3.00 ERA), 14 hits and no walks while striking out three over nine innings of work. He helped himself with the bat, hitting 2-for-5. Coincidentally, the Highlanders' starting pitcher, Andy O'Connor, was also appearing in his only major league game.

McMahon played a few years in the minor leagues. He studied dentistry at Tufts University and opened a practice in his hometown of Woburn, Massachusetts, where he died of heart trouble eight days short of his 43rd birthday.

References

Further reading
Bill Nowlin, "Doc McMahon," SABR Baseball Biography Project

External links

1886 births
1929 deaths
Boston Red Sox players
Major League Baseball pitchers
College of the Holy Cross alumni
Baseball players from Massachusetts
Lynn Shoemakers players
Lowell Tigers players
Binghamton Bingoes players